In algebra, Zariski's lemma, proved by , states that, if a field  is finitely generated as an associative algebra over another field , then  is a finite field extension of  (that is, it is also finitely generated as a vector space).

Let  and  be the natural surjection. By the lemma  is a finite extension. Since k is algebraically closed that extension must be k. Then for any ,
;

The lemma may also be understood from the following perspective. In general, a ring R is a Jacobson ring if and only if every finitely generated R-algebra that is a field is finite over R. Thus, the lemma follows from the fact that a field is a Jacobson ring.

Proofs 
Two direct proofs, one of which is due to Zariski, are given in Atiyah–MacDonald. For Zariski's original proof, see the original paper. Another direct proof in the language of Jacobson rings is given below. The lemma is also a consequence of the Noether normalization lemma. Indeed, by the normalization lemma, K is a finite module over the polynomial ring  where  are elements of K that are algebraically independent over k. But since K has Krull dimension zero and since an integral ring extension (e.g., a finite ring extension) preserves Krull dimensions, the polynomial ring must have dimension zero; i.e., .

The following characterization of a Jacobson ring contains Zariski's lemma as a special case. Recall that a ring is a Jacobson ring if every prime ideal is an intersection of maximal ideals. (When A is a field, A is a Jacobson ring and the theorem below is precisely Zariski's lemma.)

Proof: 2.  1.: Let  be a prime ideal of A and set . We need to show the Jacobson radical of B is zero. For that end, let f be a nonzero element of B. Let  be a maximal ideal of the localization . By integrality,  is a maximal ideal not containing f.

1.  2.: Since a factor ring of a Jacobson ring is Jacobson, we can assume B contains A as a subring. Then the assertion is a consequence of the next algebraic fact:

(*) Let  be integral domains such that B is finitely generated as A-algebra.

Indeed, choose a maximal ideal  of A not containing a. We now prove (*). If B contains an element that is transcendental over A, then it contains a polynomial ring over A to which φ extends (without a requirement on a) and so we can assume B is algebraic over A (by Zorn's lemma, say). Let  be the generators of B as A-algebra. Then each  satisfies the relation

Set . Next, let . Restrict the last map to B to finish the proof.

Notes

Sources 

Lemmas in algebra
Theorems about algebras